Lorenzo Ma'afu (born 13 November 1987) is a New Zealand professional rugby league footballer who plays for the Burleigh Bears in the Queensland Cup. He primarily plays . Ma'afu is of Tongan descent. Ma'afu is well known for overcoming much adversity to make it into the NRL.

Early life
Born in New Zealand, before moving to Australia. Ma'afu played his junior football for the East Hills Bulldogs in Australia before being signed by the Bulldogs RLFC.

Canterbury-Bankstown
In Round 9 of the 2008 NRL season he made his NRL debut for the Bulldogs against the Penrith Panthers.

Ipswich Jets
In 2009, he joined the Ipswich Jets in the Intrust Super Cup.

2012-14
At the start of 2012, Ma'afu was close to joining NRL club, the Manly-Warringah Sea Eagles but nothing eventuated as Sea Eagles recruitment manager, Noel Cleal, who wanted to sign him, went to the Canterbury-Bankstown Bulldogs before anything was finalized. Ma'afu was invited to do pre-season training with the Gold Coast Titans.

In June 2012, Ma'afu was invited to come down for a week to train with the Newcastle Knights at the request of Knights coach Wayne Bennett in order to possibly gain a contract.

In September 2012, Ma'afu signed a 2-year contract with the Parramatta Eels.

Townsville Blackhawks
In 2015, Ma'afu joined Townsville and played 2 seasons with the club.

Burleigh Bears
In 2017, Ma'afu joined Burleigh and made 12 appearances during the 2017 season.

Controversy
In 2010, he was banned from the sport for 15 months after his drink was spiked with ecstasy and another recreational drug. Ma'afu's ban expired on 1 February 2011 and he returned to play for the Jets.

References

External links
2012 Ipswich Jets profile

1987 births
New Zealand rugby league players
New Zealand sportspeople of Tongan descent
Canterbury-Bankstown Bulldogs players
Ipswich Jets players
Wentworthville Magpies players
Townsville Blackhawks players
Rugby league second-rows
Living people